The Royal Orthopaedic Hospital (ROH) is a National Health Service specialist orthopaedic hospital situated in Northfield, Birmingham, England. The ROH specialises in bone and joint problems.

History
The hospital's origins in a new convalescent home established by the Crippled Childrens Union at The Woodlands in Northfield in order to treat children with deformities in 1909. The building, dating from 1840, had been donated to the Crippled Childrens Union by George Cadbury, who then moved into Northfield Manor House later in 1909.

The Crippled Childrens Union merged with the Royal Orthopaedic and Spinal Hospital to form the Royal Cripples' Hospital at The Woodlands in 1925. After the joining the National Health Service in 1948, the Royal Cripples' Hospital became the Royal Orthopaedic Hospital.

A new 8-million-pound out-patient department was opened in May 2011. Its 24 consultation rooms, treatment rooms and other facilities replaced the temporary out-patients buildings that had been used since 1992.

Performance

The hospital was named by the Health Service Journal as one of the top hundred NHS trusts to work for in 2015.  At that time it had 831 full-time equivalent staff and a sickness absence rate of 4.56%. 84% of staff recommend it as a place for treatment and 67% recommended it as a place to work.

It decided to stop providing paediatric surgery after the West Midlands Quality Review Service report concluded, "that paediatric inpatient surgery would be better delivered in a hospital setting with access to extensive centralised care facilities at all times".

See also
List of hospitals in England
 List of NHS trusts
 Healthcare in West Midlands

References

External links
Official website

NHS hospitals in England
Health in Birmingham, West Midlands
Hospitals in Birmingham, West Midlands